Johan Brisinger (born 4 October 1965) is a Swedish film writer and director.  

The short film Passing Hearts, which Brisinger wrote and directed in 2004, was honoured with several awards at film festivals around the world, including the audience award at the Berlinale. At the Chicago International Children's Film Festival, it came in second in the adult live action category.

In 2006, Brisinger made his debut as a feature film writer and director with the drama Suddenly (Underbara älskade), starring Michael Nyqvist and Anastasious Soulis. It won the Peoples Choice Award at the Guldbagge Awards in 2007.

His second feature, Among Us (Änglavakt), starring Nyqvist, Izabella Scorupco, and Tchéky Karyo was released in Sweden in March 2010.

References

External links
 
 
 

Swedish film directors
1965 births
Living people